Futsal Club Liburni or short FC Liburni is a Kosovan futsal club. They have won the 2016–17 Futsal Superleague of Kosovo.

Domestic achievements 

Futsal Superleague of Kosovo
Champions (1): (2016–17)

Head coach :  Bekim Bytyqi

 at UEFA official site, .

Sports teams in Kosovo